Marshall Pleasant Teague (February 22, 1921 – February 11, 1959) was an American race car driver nicknamed by NASCAR fans as the "King of the Beach" for his performances at the Daytona Beach Road Course.

He walked into fellow Daytona Beach resident Smokey Yunick's "Best Damned Garage in Town", and launched Yunick's NASCAR mechanic career.

Career

Teague competed in 23 NASCAR Grand National Series races from 1949 to 1952, winning seven of them.

Teague approached the Hudson Motor Car Company by traveling to Michigan and visiting the automaker's factory without an appointment. By the end of his visit, Hudson virtually assured Teague of corporate support and cars, with the relationship formalized shortly after his visit. This "is generally regarded as the first stock car racing team backed by a Detroit auto manufacturer."

During the 1951 and 1952 racing seasons, Teague was a member of the Hudson Motors team and driving what were called the "Fabulous Hudson Hornet" stock cars.

Teague was also instrumental in helping Hudson tune the  straight-6 powered Hudson Hornet to its maximum stock capability.  When combined with the car's light weight and low center of gravity, the Hornet allowed Teague and the other Hudson drivers to dominate stock car racing from 1951 through 1954, consistently beating out other drivers in cars powered by larger, more modern engines. Smokey Yunick and Teague won 27 of 34 events in major stock car events.

In 1953, Teague dropped out of NASCAR following a dispute with NASCAR founder William France Sr. and went to the AAA and USAC racing circuits.

The Indianapolis 500 was part of the FIA World Championship from 1950 through 1960. Drivers competing at Indy during those years were credited with World Championship points and participation. Teague participated in three World Championship races, but scored no World Championship points.

Death
Driving a reconfigured Indy car at the newly opened Daytona International Speedway, Teague died while attempting to break the closed course speed record, which had been established by Tony Bettenhausen in qualifying for the 1957 Race of Two Worlds at about 177 mph.  Teague was conducting test sessions in preparation for the April start of the 1959 USAC Championship Car season, piloting a "Sumar Special" streamliner, a Kurtis Kraft chassis with a 270 c.i. Meyer-Drake Offenhauser engine, streamlined fenders, and a canopy enclosing the driver, thus being classified as Formula Libre.

The next day, the left rear tire was cut as a result of running over a foreign object, which forced Teague to pit.

Teague was trying to go even faster on February 11, 1959, eleven days before the first Daytona 500.  "Teague pushed the speed envelope in the high-powered Sumar Special streamliner – to an estimated ."  His car spun and flipped through the third turn and Teague was thrown, seat and all, from his car.  He died nearly instantly, eleven days shy of his 38th birthday.

Legacy
Teague was the inspiration for Doc Hudson in the film Cars.

Motorsports career results

Indianapolis 500

* Shared drive with Duane Carter, Jimmy Jackson and Tony Bettenhausen
** Shared drive with Gene Hartley

NASCAR
(key) (Bold – Pole position awarded by qualifying time. Italics – Pole position earned by points standings or practice time. * – Most laps led. ** – All laps led.)

Grand National Series

References

External links

1921 births
1959 deaths
People in the automobile industry
Hudson Motor Car Company
Sportspeople from Daytona Beach, Florida
Racing drivers from Florida
NASCAR drivers
Indianapolis 500 drivers
AAA Championship Car drivers
Racing drivers who died while racing
Sports deaths in Florida
Burials in Florida
USAC Stock Car drivers